Rage Games (formerly Rage Software) was a British video game developer. Formed in Liverpool in 1992, its video games were marked by an emphasis on graphical effects with arcade gameplay.

Rage's first title Striker sold more than one million copies throughout its two-year life cycle and established Rage as a major creative force in the interactive entertainment industry. The company went through rapid expansion in the 1990s and partnered with multiple third party software publishers for distribution of its titles.

Rage Games Limited was floated on the stock exchange in 1996 as Rage Software plc. Rage continued to form commercial partnerships with major publishing houses, including Microsoft, Intel, Dell, Compaq, Nintendo, Sony and Sega, and re-registered as a private company as Rage Software Limited in 1999.

In 2000, Rage began to expand into publishing. However, the costs of publishing and a run of games that did not sell as expected (most notably the David Beckham franchise) eventually led to the company closing in January 2003 due to bankruptcy. At its peak, it had offices in Liverpool, Birmingham, Sheffield, Newcastle, Bristol, Dundee and Warrington.

Some of the former development staff have formed other game development companies such as Realtime Worlds in Dundee, Swordfish Studios in Birmingham, Juice Games in Warrington and Venom Games in Newcastle.

List of games developed by Rage Software

1992
 Striker (Commodore Amiga, Amiga CD32, Atari ST, PC, Mega Drive/Genesis, SNES, Sega Game Gear)

1993
 Ultimate Soccer (Mega Drive/Genesis, Sega Master System, Sega Game Gear)
 World Soccer '94: Road to Glory (SNES)

1994
 Elite Soccer (Game Boy)
 Power Drive (PC, Mega Drive/Genesis, SNES, Game Gear, Amiga, Amiga CD32)
 Striker Pro (CD-i)
 World Cup Striker (SNES)

1995
 Power Drive Rally (Atari Jaguar)
 Revolution X (PC, Mega Drive/Genesis, SNES, Sega Saturn, PlayStation)
 Striker 95 (PC)
 Striker – World Cup Special (3DO)

1996
 FIFA Soccer 97 (SNES)
 Striker '96 (PC, PlayStation)

1997
 AYSO Soccer '97 (PC))
 Darklight Conflict (PC, Sega Saturn, PlayStation)
 Doom port to Sega Saturn
 Jonah Lomu Rugby (Sega Saturn, PlayStation)
 Trash It (PC, Sega Saturn, PlayStation)

1998
 Dead Ball Zone (PlayStation)
 Incoming (PC, Dreamcast)
 Jeff Wayne's The War of the Worlds (PC)

1999
 Microsoft International Football 2000 (PC)
 Millennium Soldier: Expendable (PC, PlayStation, Dreamcast)
 UEFA Striker (PlayStation, Dreamcast)

2000
 Space Debris (PlayStation)
 Wild Wild Racing (PlayStation 2)
 Rage Rally (PC)

2001
 David Beckham Soccer (PlayStation, PlayStation 2, Game Boy Advance, Game Boy Color)
 Denki Blocks (Game Boy Color, Game Boy Advance)
 E-racer (PC)
 Eurofighter Typhoon (PC)
 Global Touring Challenge: Africa (PlayStation 2)
 Hostile Waters (PC)
 Off-Road Redneck Racing (PC)
 Pocket Music (Game Boy Color, Game Boy Advance)

2002
 Go! Go! Beckham! Adventure on Soccer Island (Game Boy Advance)
 Gun Metal, (PC, Xbox)
 Incoming Forces (PC)
 Midnight GT (PC)
 Mobile Forces (PC)
 Rocky (PlayStation 2, Xbox, Game Boy Advance, GameCube)
 Totaled! (PlayStation 2, Xbox)
 Twin Caliber (PlayStation 2)

2003
 Rolling (PlayStation 2, Xbox)
 Lamborghini (PlayStation 2, Xbox)

See also
 Network 23 (company)

References

External links 

 Football in the New Media Age, Raymond Boyle, Richard Haynes, 2004.  

Defunct video game companies of the United Kingdom
Video game development companies
Juice Games
Defunct companies based in Liverpool
Video game companies established in 1992
Video game companies disestablished in 2003
1992 establishments in England 
2003 disestablishments in England